Clipper is an unincorporated community in Whatcom County, in the U.S. state of Washington.

History
A post office called Clipper was established in 1901, and remained in operation until 1955. The community took its name from the Clipper Shingle Company.

References

Unincorporated communities in Whatcom County, Washington
Unincorporated communities in Washington (state)